A number of ships of the Royal Navy have borne the name HMS Liffey, after the Irish river.  Another was planned but renamed before entering service:

 HMS Liffey was to have been a 36-gun fifth rate. She was renamed  in 1812 and launched in 1813.
  was a 50-gun fourth rate launched in 1813 and broken up in 1827.
  was a 24-gun  screw frigate of 3915 tons, launched in 1856. She became a store hulk in 1877, and was sold in 1903.
  was a Foyle-type destroyer, launched in 1904, re-designated as a  destroyer in 1913 and sold for breaking up in 1919.

Royal Navy ship names